Embedded is the debut studio album by industrial metal band Meathook Seed, released in March 1993 by Earache Records. The group was founded as a side project by Napalm Death guitarist Mitch Harris in 1992, with the goal to mix industrial metal with death metal. The band was started as a result of collaboration between Harris, and Obituary members Donald Tardy and Trevor Peres, who handled the drums and vocals respectively.

Overview

Embedded is a mix of death metal, industrial metal and hardcore punk, while the last track of the recording, "Sea of Tranquility", is an ambient and trance song. Every song in the album is different, in terms of tempo and structure alike.

Reception

AllMusic reviewer Jason Birchmeier gave the album three stars out of five, stating that "this daring album may have only been a one-off side project for the trio", and still praising it as "impressive as anything the three released with Napalm Death and Obituary in the '90s".

Track listing

Personnel

Meathook Seed

Trevor Peres – vocals
Mitch Harris – guitars, bass guitar, programming
Donald Tardy – drums

Technical personnel

Meathook Seed – production

References

1993 debut albums
Meathook Seed albums
Earache Records albums